Plamen Stoyanov Kolev (born 8 November 1971) is a Bulgarian former cyclist.

Major results
1994
 1st  Overall Tour of Mevlana
1997
 1st Stage 2 International Tour of Rhodes
2000
 1st Paris–Rouen
2003
 1st Stage 1 Critérium du Dauphiné Libéré
 10th Polynormande
2004
 1st  Road race, National Road Championships

References

1971 births
Living people
Bulgarian male cyclists
People from Kazanlak